Yaroslav Mykhailovych Sukhyi (born 26 March 1951) is a Ukrainian communist activist and politician and former member of the Verkhovna Rada.

Until the dissolution of the Soviet Union, in 1976-1991 he was communist party activist in Ternopil. Following the dissolution, Sukhyi found employment with the Ukrainian industrial giant Motor Sich.

In 2000-2014 Sukhyi was a member of the Verkhovna Rada representing Labour Ukraine and later Party of Regions. In 2000-2006 he was elected by an electoral district in Zaporizhzhia Oblast.

In 2010 Sukhyi served as a Governor of Ternopil Oblast.

References

External links
 Profile at the Official Ukraine Today portal

1951 births
Living people
People from Ternopil Oblast
University of Lviv alumni
Zaporizhzhya National Technical University alumni
Governors of Ternopil Oblast
Third convocation members of the Verkhovna Rada
Fourth convocation members of the Verkhovna Rada
Fifth convocation members of the Verkhovna Rada
Sixth convocation members of the Verkhovna Rada
Seventh convocation members of the Verkhovna Rada
Labour Ukraine politicians
Party of Regions politicians
Recipients of the Honorary Diploma of the Cabinet of Ministers of Ukraine